Manuel Prazeres (born 1 December 1927) was a Portuguese gymnast. He competed in eight events at the 1952 Summer Olympics.

References

External links
 

1927 births
Possibly living people
Portuguese male artistic gymnasts
Olympic gymnasts of Portugal
Gymnasts at the 1952 Summer Olympics
Place of birth missing
20th-century Portuguese people